Right On may refer to:

Albums
Right On! (Jenny Lee Lindberg album), 2015
Right On (The Supremes album), 1970
Right On (Wilson Pickett album), 1970

Songs
"Right On" (song), by Lil Baby
"Right On", by Marvin Gaye from his album What's Going On, (1971)
"Right On", by Boogaloo Joe Jones from Right On Brother, 1970
"Right On", by Gotthard from Firebirth, 2012
"Right On", by Ike Turner, 1972
"Right On", by OMC, 1996
"Right On", by The Rascals from Search and Nearness, 1970
"Right On!", by Silicone Soul

Other uses
Right On (TV series), a Canadian youth television series
"Right On" (Beavis and Butt-head), an episode of Beavis and Butt-head
Right On! (magazine), an American teen magazine catering to African-American readers